Since 1954 the Bilderberg Group has held a series of invitation-only meetings:

The 1976 Bilderberg conference was planned for April at The Homestead in Hot Springs, Virginia, United States. Due to the ongoing Lockheed scandal involving Prince Bernhard at the time, it was cancelled.

See also 

 Bilderberg meeting
 List of Bilderberg participants

References

External links 

Meetings